Sébastien Levicq (born 25 June 1971 in Le Havre) is a French decathlete.

Achievements

External links

1971 births
Living people
French decathletes
Athletes (track and field) at the 1996 Summer Olympics
Athletes (track and field) at the 2000 Summer Olympics
Olympic athletes of France
Sportspeople from Le Havre
Universiade medalists in athletics (track and field)
Universiade gold medalists for France
Medalists at the 1993 Summer Universiade